Xorides filiformis is a parasitoid wasp in the family Ichneumonidae that parasitizes the long-horned beetle species Ergates faber.

References

Xoridinae
Taxa named by Johann Ludwig Christian Gravenhorst
Insects described in 1829